Ivan Mladina (born July 20, 1980, in Split) is a freestyle swimmer from Croatia. Mladina made his Olympic debut for his native country at the 2000 Summer Olympics in Sydney, Australia. There he was eliminated in the qualifying heats of the Men's 100 m Butterfly, as well as in the 4 × 100 m Freestyle Relay. Four years later, when Athens, Greece hosted the Summer Olympics, Malina was once again a member of the Croatian swimming team, alongside Duje Draganja, Mario Delač and Igor Čerenšek, that did not pass the heats in the 4 × 100 m Freestyle Relay.

External links
 Short profile on Croatian Olympic Committee

1980 births
Living people
Croatian male swimmers
Croatian male freestyle swimmers
Olympic swimmers of Croatia
Swimmers at the 2000 Summer Olympics
Swimmers at the 2004 Summer Olympics
Sportspeople from Split, Croatia
Mediterranean Games silver medalists for Croatia
Mediterranean Games bronze medalists for Croatia
Mediterranean Games medalists in swimming
Swimmers at the 2001 Mediterranean Games